Saintéloc Racing is a French motorsport team. It mainly operates in rally and sports car racing series. Current series include the European Rally Championship, World Rally Championship-2 and the GT World Challenge Europe Endurance Cup. The team previously ran the Peugeot Rally Academy in the European Rally Championship after being the main Peugeot entrant in the Intercontinental Rally Challenge.

Current series results

F4 Spanish Championship

Formula 4 UAE Championship

Rally Results

WRC-2 results

* Season still in progress.

IRC results

ERC results

References

External links
 

French auto racing teams
Intercontinental Rally Challenge teams
European Rally Championship teams
Blancpain Endurance Series teams
TCR Asia Series teams
European Le Mans Series teams
World Touring Car Championship teams
Audi in motorsport
Auto racing teams established in 2004
World Rally Championship teams
Formula Regional European Championship teams